Norway competed at the 2014 Summer Youth Olympics, in Nanjing, China from 16 August to 28 August 2014.

Beach volleyball

Norway qualified a team by being the highest ranked nation not yet qualified.

Boxing

Norway qualified one boxer based on its performance at the 2014 AIBA Youth World Championships

Boys

Canoeing

Norway qualified one boat based on its performance at the 2013 World Junior Canoe Sprint and Slalom Championships.

Girls

Diving

Norway qualified two quotas based on its performance at the Nanjing 2014 Diving Qualifying Event.

Golf

Norway qualified one team of two athletes based on the 8 June 2014 IGF Combined World Amateur Golf Rankings.

Individual

Team

Gymnastics

Artistic Gymnastics

Norway qualified one athlete based on its performance at the 2014 European WAG Championships.

Girls

Handball

Norway qualified a boys' team based on its performance at the 2013 European Youth Summer Olympic Festival.

Boys' tournament

Roster

 Sindre Aho
 Kevin Gulliksen
 Tobias Hansen
 Tormod Hauane
 Aksel Horgen
 Jorgen Jansruid
 Eirik Kopp
 Sivert Nordeng
 Jonas Olsen
 Sandr Overjordet
 Magnus Rod
 Kristian Saeveras
 Simen Schonningsen
 Lasse Thorsbye

Group stage

Semifinals

Bronze-medal match

Rowing

Norway qualified two boats based on its performance at the 2013 World Rowing Junior Championships.

Qualification Legend: FA=Final A (medal); FB=Final B (non-medal); FC=Final C (non-medal); FD=Final D (non-medal); SA/B=Semifinals A/B; SC/D=Semifinals C/D; R=Repechage

Sailing

Norway qualified one boat based on its performance at the Byte CII European Continental Qualifiers.

Shooting

Norway was given a wild card to compete.

Individual

Team

Swimming

Norway qualified four swimmers.

Boys

Girls

Mixed

Wrestling

Norway qualified one athlete based on its performance at the 2014 European Cadet Championships.

Girls

References

2014 in Norwegian sport
Nations at the 2014 Summer Youth Olympics
Norway at the Youth Olympics